The men's singles tournament of the 2011 BWF World Championships (World Badminton Championships) was held from August 8 to 14. Chen Jin was the defending champion.
Lin Dan defeated Lee Chong Wei 20–22, 21–14, 23–21 in the final.

Seeds

  Lee Chong Wei (final)
  Lin Dan (champion)
  Peter Gade (semifinals)
  Taufik Hidayat (second round)
  Chen Long (first round)
  Chen Jin (semifinals)
  Nguyễn Tiến Minh (quarterfinals)
  Du Pengyu (third round)
  Park Sung-hwan (third round)
  Boonsak Ponsana (third round)
  Sho Sasaki (quarterfinals)
  Lee Hyun-il (third round)
  Simon Santoso (third round)
  Marc Zwiebler (second round)
  Kenichi Tago (first round)
  Hu Yun (first round)

Draw

Finals

Section 1

Section 2

Section 3

Section 4

References
Main Draw

2011 BWF World Championships